Incorporated is the fourth and final full-length studio album by American groove metal band Grip Inc. It was released on March 16, 2004.

Track listing

Personnel
 Waldemar Sorychta – guitar, backing vocals, producer, engineer
 Gus Chambers – vocals
 Dave Lombardo – drums
 Stuart Carruthers – bass
 Eicca Toppinen – cello
 Sami Yli-Sirniö – sitar
 Su Maha Ya – violin
 Jeff Collin – vocals
 Dennis Koehne – engineer
 Siggi Bemm – engineer

2004 albums
Grip Inc. albums
SPV/Steamhammer albums
Albums produced by Waldemar Sorychta